The 1997 PSA Men's ASCM-Sharp World Open Squash Championship is the men's edition of the 1997 World Open, which serves as the individual world championship for squash players. The event took place in Petaling Jaya in Malaysia from 4 November to 9 November 1997. Rodney Eyles won his first World Open title, defeating Peter Nicol in the final.

Seeds

Draw and results

See also
PSA World Open
1997 Women's World Open Squash Championship

References

External links
World Open on paderborner-squash-club.de
World Squash History

World Squash Championships
M
1997 in Malaysian sport
Squash tournaments in Malaysia
Petaling Jaya
International sports competitions hosted by Malaysia